The 1965 All-Ireland Under-21 Football Championship was the second staging of the All-Ireland Under-21 Football Championship since its establishment by the Gaelic Athletic Association in 1964.

Kerry were the defending champions from the previous championship, however, they did not field a team.

On 3 October 1965, Kildare won the championship following a 2-11 to 1-7 defeat of Cork in the All-Ireland final. This was their first All-Ireland title.

Results

All-Ireland Under-21 Football Championship

Final

Statistics

Miscellaneous

 Down win the Ulster title for the first time in their history.

References

1965
All-Ireland Under-21 Football Championship